This is a list of department stores of the United States from past and present.

Department stores

Corporate chains national 
 Hudson Bay Company
Saks Fifth Avenue
 Saks Off 5th
 Macy's
Bloomingdale's
 Neiman Marcus Group, Inc.
Neiman Marcus
 Last Call
 Bergdorf Goodman
 Nordstrom, Inc.
 Nordstrom
 Nordstrom Rack

Regional department stores 
 Bealls, 58 stores (Florida)
 Belk, 239 stores, (Alabama, Arkansas, Florida, Georgia, Kentucky, Louisiana, Maryland, Mississippi, Missouri, North Carolina, Oklahoma, South Carolina, Tennessee, Texas, Virigina, West Virginia)
 Boscov's, 50 stores, (Connecticut, Delaware, Maryland, New Jersey, New York, Ohio, Pennsylvania, Rhode Island)
 Dillard's, 285 stores, (Alabama, Arizona, Arkansas, California, Colorado, Florida, Georgia, Idaho, Illinois, Indiana, Iowa, Kansas, Kentucky, Louisiana, Mississippi, Missouri, Montana, Nebraska, Nevada, New Mexico, North Carolina, Ohio, Oklahoma, South Carolina, Tennessee, Texas, Utah, Virigina, Wyoming)
 Von Maur, 38 stores, (Alabama, Georgia, Illinois, Indiana, Iowa, Kansas, Kentucky, Michigan, Minnesota, Missouri, Nebraska, New York, Ohio, Oklahoma, Wisconsin)

Discount department stores 
 Academy Sports + Outdoors
 Amazing Savings (New Jersey, New York)
 Bob's Stores, 24 stores, (Connecticut, Massachusetts, New Hampshire, New York, Rhode Island)
 Burlington
 Dick's Sporting Goods
 JCPenney
 Kohl's
 Ross Stores
 Sears
Kmart
 TJX Companies
TJ Maxx
Marshalls

Independent department stores 
 Boyds (Philadelphia)
 David M. Brian (Walnut Creek and Danville, California) owned by McCaulou's
 Dunham's Department Store (Wellsboro, Pennsylvania)
 Flemington Department Store (Flemington, New Jersey)
 Fords Federated Store (Hamilton, Montana)
 Getz's (Marquette, Michigan)
 Georg Jensen Inc. (New York, NY)
 Gus Mayer (Birmingham, Alabama and Nashville, Tennessee)
 Halls (Kansas City, Missouri)
 Jos. Kuhn & Co. (Champaign, Illinois)
Kraus Department Store (Erie, Pennsylvania)
La Epoca (Miami, Florida)
 LaVogue Department Store (Hoquiam, Washington)
 Leader Department Store (Cambridge, Minnesota)
 Loeb's (Meridian, Mississippi)
 Mack & Dave's Department Store (Huntington, West Virginia)
 McCaulou's Department Store (Lafayette, California)
 Murphy's (Stillwater, Oklahoma)
 Neilson's (Oxford, Mississippi)
 Nichols Stores (northern and western Louisiana)
Neighborhood Goods (Plano, Austin in Texas; Chelsea Market, New York City)
 Reed's (Columbus, Starkville and Tupelo, Mississippi)
 Ruben's (Augusta, Georgia)
 Rubensteins (formerly Rubenstein Brothers) (New Orleans, Louisiana)
 Schroeder's (Two Rivers, Wisconsin)
 Shirokiya (Honolulu)
 The ADdress (American Dream Mall, New Jersey)
 The SM Store (Guam — part of a Philippine chain)
 Stahlke's (Mora, Minnesota)
 Stanley Korshak (Dallas)
 Tomah Cash Mercantile (Tomah, Wisconsin)
 Wakefield's (Anniston, Alabama)
 Weaver's (Lawrence, Kansas)
 Scott Seale's Rask Fine Jewelry and MAX Clothing Stores (Denver, Colorado)
 Young's Department Store (Middle River, Minnesota)

Defunct department stores
 See List of defunct department stores of the United States

Defunct department stores now online 
Montgomery Ward
The Bon-Ton
Lord & Taylor
Launching Soon

Bergner's
Boston Store
Carson's
Elder-Beerman
Goody's
Gordmans
Herberger's
Palais Royal
Peebles
Stage Store
Younkers

Discount stores 

 Bargain Hunt
 Ben Franklin
 Bi-Mart
 Big Lots
 BJ's Wholesale Club
 Burlington
 Christmas Tree Shops
 Costco
 Dd's Discounts  
 Dirt Cheap
 Dollar General
 Dollar Tree
 Family Dollar
 Five Below
 Fred Meyer
 Gabe's
 Harbor Freight Tools
 HomeGoods
 HomeSense
 Marshalls
 Meijer
 National Stores
 Ocean State Job Lot
 Ollie's Bargain Outlet
 Renys
 Roses
 Ross Stores
 Sam's Club
 Target
 T.J. Maxx
 Treasure Hunt
 Tuesday Morning
 Walmart

Defunct

See also 

 List of hypermarkets in the United States
 List of supermarket chains in the United States
Retail apocalypse

References 

Department Stores Of The United States
Department Stores